Pamela Abbott, FAcSS (born 27 June 1947) is a British academic in sociology, gender and development studies. She is Director of the Centre for Global Development and Professor in the School of Education  at the University of Aberdeen, and Director of the Centre for Global Development.

Abbott leads the Scottish Government-funded research project Fostering a Social Practice Approach to Adult Literacies for Improving People’s Quality of Life in Western Rwanda.

In her writings on feminist perspectives in sociology, Abbott challenges a limited consideration of gender issues within mainstream sociology, and advocates a reconceputialisation and interdisciplinary approach in order to question fundamental assumptions in the discipline.

Abbott's recent research interests focus on quality of life and socioeconomic transitions in societies experiencing transformations following the Arab Spring.

Selected bibliography

Books

Journal articles

References

External links 
 Profile page: Professor Pamela Abbott, The School of Social Science, University of Aberdeen

British sociologists
1947 births
Academics of the University of Aberdeen
Fellows of the Academy of Social Sciences
Living people
British women sociologists